Drottnar is an extreme metal band from Fredrikstad, Norway. Formed in 1996, the band has released four albums, Spiritual Battle (2000), Welterwerk (2006), Stratum (2012) and Monolith (2019) and an EP titled Anamorphosis (2003). The first album was released on UK label Plankton Records. They are currently signed to Swedish label Endtime Productions (Extol, Antestor, Crimson Moonlight).

Drottnar is the plural (sing. Drottinn, Norwegian "Drott") of an Icelandic word for master, ruler or king. Originally adopting a Viking image, the band is currently known for their peculiar thematics and live shows where they use military uniforms reminiscent of the Soviet style.

History
The band was originally formed under the name Vitality in 1996 by four Lind siblings: vocalist Sven-Erik Lind, guitarist-keyboardist Karl Fredrik Lind, drummer Glenn-David Lind, and bassist Bjarne Peder Lind. They recorded their first two demos at X-Ray Studios. The first one, titled Doom of Antichrist, was released in May 1996.

In 1998, the name was changed to Drottnar and a demo titled A White Realm was recorded in September.

In 2000, the band released their demos together as an album titled Spiritual Battle. It was published by UK based label Plankton Records. The demos were remastered for the album, and Spiritual Battle was well received by Cross Rhythms Magazine.

A year later, Drottnar entered the studio of Black Woods Productions and recorded a song called "Trellebaand Maa Briste" for the Swedish label Endtime Productions' compilation album In the Shadow of Death.

The band changed its image a bit and used more militant elements such as gas masks as part of its live shows. In 2003, Drottnar recorded an EP titled Anamorphosis on the Norwegian label Momentum Scandinavia. The EP was limited to 850 copies, and contains an intro and three songs with violins on the intro and other parts. Bass player Bjarne Peder Lind left the band before the album was recorded. Drottnar was joined by guitarist Bengt Olsson and bassist Håvar Wormdahl.

In 2005, the band was signed to Endtime Productions, and entered Subsonic Studios to record new material. Some elements such as trumpet were recorded in Ostrava, Czech Republic by Jan-Espen S. Schildmann. In April 2006, the band released an album titled Welterwerk. A 7-inch vinyl single titled Ad Hoc Revolt was also released for promotional purposes. Around the time of the album's release, the band began using early 20th century military regalia as part of their image.

Drottnar has performed with bands such as Grimfist and Extol. The band played a short tour in the U.S. in summer 2008, performing at the Cornerstone Festival.

On February 1, 2009, the band announced that it was recording a new album. The next day, Drottnar announced the departure of guitarist Bengt Olsson. However, later that year, on August 12, the band announced that Olsson had rejoined Drottnar. Recording continued for the next few years. A single from the album, "Lucid Stratum", was released on November 8, 2011. On October 13, 2012, the band released the new album, entitled Stratum, in digital format, as well as a music video for the song "We March". In 2017 the band released the first of a trio of EPs, Monolith I, followed by Monolith II and Monolith III in 2018. All three have met with very positive praise from fans, showcasing a more raw, even more experimental sound than previous material.

Festival performances
Drottnar has played at notable festivals such as Sweden's Endtime Fest, Norway's Nordic Fest,  Netherlands' Brainstorm Fest, Switzerland's Elements of Rock, and Finland's Immortal Metal Fest.

Lyrics and themes
In the beginning the band's lyrics dealt with Christianity with a brutal and extreme approach; the lyrics on the album Spiritual Battle were inspired by the Book of Revelation and dealt mostly with the battle ravaging the spiritual world. The band members have said "The Norwegian black metal scene does not influence our lyrics, but the lyrics are still written in a black metal way, fitting our music well."

Currently Drottnar has had a special feature for several years, the use of Czech or "Soviet" style elements: the song titles and lyrics contain Soviet-sounding words and metaphors, some songs contain samples of radio play or radio communication elements involved in the 20th century, and at concerts all band members used Soviet uniforms,. The vocalist Sven-Erik Lind typically uses effects such as megaphones to create a military atmosphere.

Musical style
Drottnar's general style has been described as black metal, death/doom, and Folk metal. On Spiritual Battle, the band was compared to Groms, Extol, and Antestor, and Sven-Erik used a vocal style ranging from growling to a more high-pitched style. With the release of Welterwerk, Drottnar broadened their style, "aiming somewhere between Atheist, Extol, and the most complex Mayhem material and almost hitting the mark."

Discography

Albums
 Welterwerk (2006, Endtime Productions)
 Stratum (2012, Endtime Productions)
 Monolith (2019, Endtime Productions)

Singles
 "Lucid Stratum" Single (2011, Endtime Productions)
 "Wolves and Lambs' Single (2016, Endtime Productions)

Extended Plays
 Anamorphosis EP (2003, Momentum Scandinavia)
 Ad Hoc Revolt 7-inch EP (2006, Endtime Productions)
 Monolith I EP (2017, Endtime Productions)
 Monolith II EP (2018, Endtime Productions)
 Monolith III EP (2018, Endtime Productions)

Demo
 Doom of Antichrist (Demo, 1997) as Vitality
 Demo 96/97 (Demo, 1997) as Vitality
 A White Realm (Demo, 1998)

Compilation
 Spiritual Battle (Compilation, 2000, 
Plankton Records)

Members
Current lineup

Karl Fredrik Lind – guitar (1996–present), Vocals (2013-present)
Håvar Wormdahl – bass guitar (2003–present)
Glenn-David Lind – drums (1996–present)

Former members
Sven-Erik Lind – vocals (1996-2013)
Bengt Olsson – guitar (1996-2013)
Bjarne Peder Lind – bass guitar (1996-2003)

Timeline

Notes

References

External links

 Official website

Norwegian unblack metal musical groups
Norwegian death metal musical groups
Norwegian doom metal musical groups
Norwegian viking metal musical groups
Musical groups established in 1996
1996 establishments in Norway
Musical groups from Fredrikstad